Rumble Fish is a 1983 film.

Rumble Fish or Rumblefish may also refer to:

 Rumble Fish (novel), a 1975 novel by S. E. Hinton; basis for the film
 The Rumble Fish, a 2004 2D fighting video game
 The Rumble Fish 2, a 2005 sequel to the above

Music 
 Rumblefish (band), a UK pop band formed in 1986
 Rumble Fish (band), a Korean rock group
 Rumble Fish (singer) (born 1982), South Korean singer-songwriter
 Rumblefish Inc., a music licensing company
 "Rumble Fish" (song), a 2000 song by Do As Infinity
 "Rumble Fish", a 1993 song by Desert Hearts
 "Rumblefish", a 1994 song by The Goats from No Goats, No Glory
 "Rumble Fish", a 1999 song by Sevendust from the album Home
 "Rumblefish", a 2000 song by Bonnie Pink from the album Let Go
 "Rumblefish", nickname of the music producer Tom Gilles, a co-founder of Big Blue Meenie Recording Studio

See also 
 Siamese fighting fish, a popular fish in the aquarium trade